The 1921 Missouri Tigers football team was an American football team that represented the University of Missouri in the Missouri Valley Intercollegiate Athletic Association (Missouri Valley) during the 1921 college football season. The team compiled a 6–2 record (4–2 against Missouri Valley opponents), finished in a tie for second place in the Missouri Valley conference, and outscored all opponents by a combined total of 136 to 50. James Phelan was the head coach for the second of two seasons. The team played its home games at Rollins Field in Columbia, Missouri.

Schedule

References

Missouri
Missouri Tigers football seasons
Missouri Tigers football